John Zakour (born 1957) is an American science-fiction and humor writer.

Biography
Zakour was born in upstate New York, in 1957.  He is a graduate of the State University of New York at Potsdam where he received a BA in computer science.  Before becoming a popular writer he worked for many years as a database programmer/Web guy for the New York State Agricultural Experiment Station, which is part of Cornell University.  He has also been an Emergency Medical Technician and a judo instructor.  He also has an online MA in human behavior and is a Chief Happiness Practitioner.  He is married and has one son.

Bibliography
Science Fiction

The Plutonium Blonde (Daw 2001, with Larry Ganem)
The Doomsday Brunette (Daw 2004, with Larry Ganem)
The Radioactive Redhead (Daw 2005, with Larry Ganem)
The Frost Haired Vixen (Daw 2006)
The Blue Haired Bombshell (Daw 2007)
The Flaxen Femme Fatale (Daw 2008)
"The Sapphire Sirens" (Daw 2009)
"The Peach Blonde Bomber" (Short-Prequel) (2013, with Larry Ganem)
"The Raven Haired Rogue" ( Serializes, 2015)

Young Adult Science Fiction and Fantasy

Baxter Moon Galactic Scout (Brown Barn Books 2008)
Illusia (Meadowhawk 2008, with Elizabeth Keller)
Stormy Knight Prom Queen of the Undead (Blueleaf 2011)
Diary of a Super Girl" Book 1 (KC Enterprises 2017)
Diary of a Super Girl" Book 2 (KC Enterprises 2017)
Diary of a Super Girl" Book 3 (KC Enterprises 2017)
Diary of a Super Girl" Book 4 (KC Enterprises 2017)
Diary of a Super Girl" Book 5 (KC Enterprises 2017)
Diary of a Super Girl" Book 6 (KC Enterprises 2017)
Diary of a Super Girl" Book 7 (KC Enterprises 2017)
Diary of a Super Girl" Book 8 (KC Enterprises 2018)
OMG I Shrunk my BFF" Book 1 (KC Enterprises 2017)
OMG I Shrunk my BFF" Book 2 (KC Enterprises 2017)
OMG I Shrunk my BFF" Book 3 (KC Enterprises 2017)
Girl Power: A Modern Day Fairy Tale: The Once and Future Queen 1 (KC Enterprises 2017)
Girl Power: Book 2 (KC Enterprises 2017)
Girl Power: Book 3 (KC Enterprises 2017)
Diary of a Super Clone: Adam's Story" Book 1 (KC Enterprises 2017)
Diary of a Super Clone" Book 2 (KC Enterprises 2017)
Diary of a Super Clone" Book 3 (KC Enterprises 2017)
Diary of a Super Clone" Book 4 (KC Enterprises 2018)
Nina the Friendly Vampire" Book 1 (KC Enterprises 2018)
Nina the Friendly Vampire" Book 2 (KC Enterprises 2018)
Nina the Friendly Vampire" Book 3 (KC Enterprises 2018)
Interactive
"The Bionic Bikini I (Delight Games 2014)
"The Bionic Bikini II (Delight Games 2015)

Humor

Man's Guide to Pregnancy (Metropolis 2003)
Man's Guide to Babies (Metropolis 2004)
Couples Guide to Pregnancy (Blueleaf 2012)
Man's Guide to Weddings (Blueleaf 2012)

Syndicated Comics

Working Daze (United Media, Andre Noel artist/co-creator, followed by Kyler Miller, then Scott Roberts)
Writer for the Rugrats comics

Computer Games / Apps
80 Days (Dialog, English version, Frogwares)
"Space Run" (Frogwares)
Idol Killer (Story, Idol Games)
StarDroid (Story, Dialogues, Krauss & Boll Software)
"Beat the Boss 4" (Dialogs, Game Hive)
"Tap Tycoon" (Dialogs and Businesses, Game Hive)
•"Oho's Big Day!" (Kids app EzEz apps)

Short Stories 
"Dog Gone" (Sirius The Dog Star, Daw 2004)
"Double Trouble" (Gateways, Daw 2005)
"Modern Mating" (Journal of Nature, Futures, 19 July 2007)

Comic Books 
The Simpsons 
Fairly Odd Parents
Jimmy Neutron
Rugrats all Grown Up

References

External links

Nuclear Bombshell at GraphicAudio
The Peach Blond Bomber at Soundcloud

Interviews
From AMCtv.com
From Pink RayGun
Audio interview From Adventure in Sci Fi Publishing
Audio interview From GraphicAudio

21st-century American novelists
American humorists
American male novelists
American science fiction writers
Living people
1957 births
American male short story writers
21st-century American short story writers
21st-century American male writers